Isley is an English surname. The name can also be used as an anglicized variant for the German surnames Eisele and Eisler. Notable people with the surname include:

The Isley Brothers, American musical group
Ernie Isley (born 1952), American musician and member of The Isley Brothers
Marvin Isley (1953–2010), American musician and member of The Isley Brothers
O'Kelly Isley, Jr. (1937–1986), American musician and member of The Isley Brothers
Ronald Isley (born 1941), American musician and member of The Isley Brothers
Rudolph Isley (born 1939), American musician and member of The Isley Brothers
Vernon Isley (1942–1955), American musician and member of The Isley Brothers
Albert Isley (1871–1953), American judge, lawyer, and politician
Alexander Isley (born 1961), American graphic designer
Ernie Isley (politician) (born 1937), Canadian politician
Henry Isley (16th century), English nobleman
Troy Isley (born 1998), American boxer

See also
Pamela Isley, the fictional DC Comics supervillain known as Poison Ivy

Isely
 Duane Isely (1918–2000), American botanist

English-language surnames